Pseudoacontias menamainty is a species of lizard which is endemic to Madagascar.

References

menamainty
Reptiles of Madagascar
Reptiles described in 2002
Taxa named by Franco Andreone
Taxa named by Allen Eddy Greer